Aco Mavec (8 December 1929 – 17 August 1982) was a Slovene painter, best known for his illustrations of children's books and comics.

He won the Levstik Award for his illustrations of Robert Louis Stevenson's Treasure Island (Otok zakladov) in 1966.

Selected illustrated works

 Hotel sem prijeti sonce (I Wanted to Touch the Sun), written by Tone Partljič, 1981
 Uganke (Riddles), written by Helena Bizjak, 1980
 Stopinje po zraku in kako sta jih odkrila Naočnik in Očalnik, mojstra med detektivi (Footprints in the Air and How They Were Discovered by Specs and Goggles, Master Detectives), written by Leopold Suhodolčan, 1977
 Na večerji s krokodilom: nove detektivske mojstrovine Naočnika in Očalnika (Dinner With the Crocodile, the New Detective Adventures of Specs and Goggles, written by Leopold Suhodolčan, 1976
 Naočnik in očalnik, mojstra med detektivi (Specs and Goggles, Master Detectives), written by Leopold Suhodolčan, 1973
 Potopljeni mesec (The Sunken Moon), written by Janez Juvan, 1965

References

Slovenian male painters
Slovenian children's book illustrators
Slovenian illustrators
Slovenian cartoonists
Slovenian caricaturists
Slovenian comics artists
1929 births
1982 deaths
Levstik Award laureates
University of Ljubljana alumni
20th-century Slovenian painters
20th-century Slovenian male artists